Kul-e Jaz (also Romanized as Kūl-e Jāz; also known as Kūleh Jāz) is a village in Howmeh-ye Sharqi Rural District, in the Central District of Izeh County, Khuzestan Province, Iran. At the 2006 census, its population was 29, in 4 families.

References 

Populated places in Izeh County